Vinko Vrbanić (born 12 May 1951) is a Croatian writer who lives in Vinkovci, Croatia. He is best known for his published short stories, novellas Furmani (Carters) and Sokolov let (Flight of the Falcon), and coming-of-age novel Glasovi u šumi (Voices in the Forest). He graduated from the School of Agriculture in Požega, worked in construction, and fought in the Croatian War of Independence.

Genre 
Novellas Furmani [Carters] and Sokolov let [Flight of the Falcon] are collections of diverse tales connected by loose narratives about the tragic lives of common folk. Whereas, the coming-of-age novel Glasovi u šumi [Voices in the Forest] traces the life of a mischievous boy growing up in a Croatian village during times of socio-political upheaval.
“At last, we received a storyteller who stepped away from traditional themes and turned towards the urban setting, telling stories that avoid romantic or melodramatic content,” says Zlatko Virc in Vinkovacki list [Vinkovci Newspaper].

Themes 
The short stories in Sokolov let [Flight of the Falcon] trace the struggles and destinies of the ordinary people caught between the great military powers during the decline of the  Ottoman Empire.
In Furmani [Carters], the author examines fate in short stories about people from the bottom of the social ladder who turn to alcohol as a way to cope with their broken lives.
His coming-of-age novel Glasovi u šumi [Voices in the Forest] captures the persistent struggle for a better life and brutality of those in power.

Style 
Vrbanić writes short, inter-connected narratives with a discernible beginning, climax, and resolution encapsulated within self-contained chapters that demonstrate the author's skill as storyteller from an oral tradition.

Bibliography 
 Novel Voices in the Forest, Independently published, 2019 
 Short story "Gvozdansko" (Cro), književnost.hr, KNJIŽEVNOST.HR, 2018
 Short story "Gvozdansko" (Eng), ZiN Daily, ZVONA i NARI, 2018
 Short story "Kuga", književnost.hr, KNJIŽEVNOST.HR, 2018
 Short story "Beograd", ZiN Daily, ZVONA i NARI, 2018
 Short story "Cvija", Darežljivo srce, Glas Koncila, 2016
 Short story “Rakija”, Dar Domovine, Glas Koncila, 2014
 Novel Glasovi u šumi, Modimac Ltd., 2012
 Novellas Furmani–Sokolov let, Modimac Ltd., 2011
 Short story "Riječka luka", Moji Vinkovci, Privlačica, 2010
 Short stories "Džepni sat" and "Božić", Moji Vinkovci, Privlačica, 2009

Awards 
 2nd shared prize [pohvalnica] for a drama "Dvadeseto pjevanje" at 36th HSK National Literary Competition 2017
 1st prize for a short story "Cvija" at the Dr. Stjepan Kranjčić Literary Competition 2016
 Short story "Rakija" selected for publication in the journal Dar Domovine, as part of the Dr. Stjepan Kranjčić Literary Competition 2014

Sources

External links

 Vinko Vrbanić author's profile at goodreads.com
 Article about book promotion at vinkovci.com.hr
 Poem quoting Vinko Vrbanić's view on the earned privilege of the women at authorsden.com
 Vinko Vrbanić author's profile at najboljeknjige.com
 Glasovi u šumi book review at vinkovci.com.hr
 Glasovi u šumi description at booksa.hr

1951 births
Living people
People from Vinkovci
Croatian male short story writers
Croatian short story writers
Croatian male writers
Croatian novelists